The Fordham Company is a real estate development company founded in 1988 and based out of Chicago, Illinois.  The company's chairman is Christopher T. Carley. As of 2015 they had developed over 16,000 residential units.

The company owns several skyscrapers and buildings in downtown Chicago including "65 East Goethe," The Fordham, and The Pinnacle.  The Fordham Company also began development of the  Fordham Spire project, which was purchased by Shelbourne Development and renamed the Chicago Spire. The Spire was never completed.  Fordham was also involved in the development of the unbuilt Waldorf-Astoria Hotel and Residence Tower.

References

External links
Fordham Company Web Site

Real estate companies of the United States
Companies based in Chicago
Real estate companies established in 1988